Alausí Parish is an urban parish in Ecuador, Chimborazo Province, Alausí Canton. Its seat is Alausí.

References 
 www.inec.gov.ec
 www.ame.gov.ec

External links 
 Map of the Chimborazo Province

Parishes of Ecuador
Geography of Chimborazo Province